Sergio Guerrero may refer to:
 Sergio Guerrero (composer)
 Sergio Guerrero (footballer)